Dynamic Stillness is a 2-disc album by the American ambient musician Steve Roach, released in 2009.

Production
Dynamic Stillness is composed of pieces created in solitude over a period of three years. The resulting pieces emote the slow, powerful energies of expanding cloud formations and the silence of the sprawling land beneath.

Immediately after the release of Dynamic Stillness, Steve Roach commenced with a continuation of the atmospheric theme, creating the long-form piece, Afterlight.

Album artwork
The photographs used in the artwork were created by Michal Karcz, whose imagery is nearly achromatic in nature.  The six-panel digipack album opens to reveal stark imagery of perfect desolation beneath foreboding clouds. This magnificent contrast is, of course, observed in the album's title.

The artwork played an integral part in the creation of the music.  Steve Roach and Michal Karcz traded music and artwork for nearly two years.  Roach's pieces evolved with the imagery, as Karcz's graphic work evolved with the music, resulting in one of the most integrated releases of Roach's career.

Track listing

Personnel
Steve Roach – synthesizers
Michal Karcz – cover images
Sam Rosenthal – mastering

See also
Ambient music
Electronic music

References

External links
 Dynamic Stillness at Projekt Records

2009 albums
Steve Roach (musician) albums
Projekt Records albums
Ambient albums by American artists